Yahchouch is a municipality in the Keserwan District of the  Keserwan-Jbeil Governorate in Lebanon. It is located 42 kilometers north of Beirut. Its average elevation is 670 meters above sea level and its total land area is 636 hectares. Yahchouch's inhabitants are predominantly Maronite Catholics and Christians from other denominations.

The municipality has eight Maronite churches (St. Semaan, Wardieh, Saydet Ghoshraya, St. John, St. Takla, St. Therese, St. Bechara and Saydet Shouan) and several other Christian churches. Its inhabitants are entirely Christian. The Lebanese surname "Yahchouchi" derives from this village. The prominent families of the village are Mouawad, Keyrouz, Zouein, Turk, Assaf, Souaid, Bedrane, Barakat, Atallah, Akil, Tawil, Ghanem, El Jorr, Yahchouchi and others.

Yahchouch is home to the Jabal Moussa reserve.

References

Populated places in Keserwan District
Maronite Christian communities in Lebanon